Baqa ash-Sharqiyya is a Palestinian town in the northern West Bank, located  northeast of Tulkarm in the Tulkarm Governorate. According to the Palestinian Central Bureau of Statistics (PCBS), the town had a population of 4,101 inhabitants in 2007. Refugees made up 20.4% of the Baqa ash-Sharqiyya's population in 1997.

Approximately  to the west, on the other side of the Green Line, lies Baqa al-Gharbiyye, ("the western bouquet of flowers") which is under Israeli jurisdiction. Both towns were originally one town, known as Baqa, until the aftermath of the 1948 Arab-Israeli War. Prior to the Second Intifada, Baqa ash-Sharqiyya consisted of 4,000 dunams; Israel confiscated about 2,000 dunams of land in order to build the Israeli West Bank barrier.

History
Ceramic from the Hellenistic, early and late Roman, Byzantine and the Middle Ages have been found here.

In 1265, Baqa ash-Sharqiyya was among the estates Sultan Baibars handed to his followers, after he had defeated the Crusaders; the whole of Baqa ash-Sharqiyya was given to Emir 'Ala' al-Din Aidakin al-Bunduqdar al-Salihi.

Ottoman era
During early Ottoman rule, in 1596, Baqa ash-Sharqiyya was located in the nahiya of Qaqun in the Sanjak of Nablus. It had a population of 35 Muslim households, and paid taxes on wheat, barley, summer crops, olives, goats and/or bees, and a press for olives or grapes; a total of 14,000  akçe.

In 1838 it was noted as a  village, Bakah,  in the western Esh-Sha'rawiyeh administrative region, north of Nablus.

In 1882 the PEF's Survey of Western Palestine described Baqa as "a very small hamlet on high ground, with olives. It has a well to the south and a little Mukam (Muslim tomb) to the north; scattered olives surround it, and there are two or three palms close by. A few houses stand separate, on the south east, near a second Mukam, called Abu Nar ("Father of Fire")."   A stone with Arabic inscriptions located over the entrance of the old village mosque could be the beginning of an endowment (waqf) text.

A population list from about 1887 showed that  Baqa ash-Sharqiyya had about  180 inhabitants, all Muslim.

British Mandate era
In the 1922 census of Palestine conducted by the British Mandate authorities, Baqa Sharkiyeh had a population of 269, all Muslims,  increasing by the 1931 census to 330, still all Muslim, in 67 houses.

In the 1945 statistics the population of Baqa ash-Sharqiyya consisted of 480, all Muslim, with a land area of 3,986  dunams, according to an official land and population survey. Of this, 173 dunams were designated for plantations and irrigable land, 2,870 for cereals, while 14 dunams were built-up areas.

Jordanian era
In the wake of the 1948 Arab–Israeli War, and after the 1949 Armistice Agreements, Baqa ash-Sharqiyya  came under Jordanian rule.  As part of the 1949 armistice agreements following the 1948 Arab-Israeli war, King Abdullah of Jordan ceded the captured Wadi Ara region to Israel in exchange for land near Hebron. This resulted in Baqa al-Gharbiyye falling on the western side of the Green Line, separated from its eastern counterpart, Baqa ash Sharqiyya. The separated towns still have close social and economic ties, however this has been reduced due to the completion of the West Bank barrier around the "Baqa enclave" of the Seam Zone.

In 1961, the population was  952.

Post-1967
After the Six-Day War in 1967, Baqa ash-Sharqiyya has been under Israeli occupation.

On 27 February 1988 Rawda Najib Hassa, aged 13, was shot dead in Baqa ash-Sharqiyya. The suspected killer was an Israeli citizen from Halamish but was not charged due to lack of evidence.

Health care
Baqa ash-Sharqiyya houses the Mother and Child Health Centre (MCH), which is used by the three surrounding Palestinian villages (Nazlat Abu Nar and An-Nazla al-Gharbiya). The healthcare facilities for Baqa ash-Sharqiyya are designated as MOH level 3.

References

Bibliography

External links
Welcome To Baqa al-Sharqiya
Baqa ash-Sharqiya, Welcome to Palestine
Survey of Western Palestine, Map 11:   IAA, Wikimedia commons 

Tulkarm Governorate
Towns in the West Bank
Municipalities of the State of Palestine